Sparks is an unincorporated community in Doniphan County, Kansas, United States.

History
A post office was opened in Sparks in 1871, and remained in operation until it was discontinued in 1971. The post office there was officially called Highland Station until October, 1908.

References

Further reading

External links
 Doniphan County maps: Current, Historic, KDOT

Unincorporated communities in Doniphan County, Kansas
Unincorporated communities in Kansas
1871 establishments in Kansas
Populated places established in 1871